Eduardo Antonio Furniel Arriagada (born 2 January 1956), commonly known as Eduardo Fournier, is a Chilean former footballer who played at both professional and international levels before becoming a coach.

Career

Playing career
Born in Talca, Fournier played as a goalkeeper for clubs including Audax Italiano and Cobreloa.

Fournier represented Chile at the 1984 Summer Olympics. Fournier also made one appearance for Chile in the 1987 Pan-American games.

Coaching career
After retiring as a player, Fournier became a football coach and managed a number of Chilean club sides including Rangers and Cobreloa. From 2008 to 2017, he worked as goalkeeping coach of Santiago Wanderers.

Personal life
His son, Gianni Furniel, also known as Gianni Fournier, is a former professional footballer who played as a defender for Rangers de Talca and Fernández Vial.

References

External links
 
 

1956 births
Living people
Chilean people of French descent
People from Talca
Chilean footballers
Chile international footballers
C.D. Aviación footballers
Deportes Concepción (Chile) footballers
Cobreloa footballers
C.D. Arturo Fernández Vial footballers
Universidad de Chile footballers
Provincial Osorno footballers
Audax Italiano footballers
Chilean Primera División players
Primera B de Chile players
Association football goalkeepers
Chilean football managers
Rangers de Talca managers
Cobreloa managers
Chilean Primera División managers
Footballers at the 1984 Summer Olympics
Olympic footballers of Chile
Pan American Games medalists in football
Pan American Games silver medalists for Chile
Footballers at the 1987 Pan American Games
Medalists at the 1987 Pan American Games